William Alfred Himsworth (August 28, 1820 – 1880) was a Canadian civil servant and the Clerk of the Privy Council of Canada.

Born in Trois-Rivières, Lower Canada (now Quebec), he was educated at the college of Montreal and was called to the Lower Canada Bar in 1841. In 1867, he was the assistant clerk of the Privy Council for Canada and was clerk from 1872 to his death in 1880.

References
 

1820 births
1880 deaths
Clerks of the Privy Council (Canada)